The Parvenus (Slovene: Jara gospoda) is a 1953 Yugoslav historical drama film directed by Bojan Stupica and starring Vladimir Skrbinsek,  Elvira Kralj and Ljudevit Pristavec. It is based on a novel by Janko Kersnik portraying life amongst the Slovenian elite of Trieste, then part of the Austro-Hungarian Empire, during the 1890s.

Partial cast
 Vladimir Skrbinsek as Tine pl. Mali  
 Elvira Kralj as Tercijalka  
 Ljudevit Pristavec as Sodni pisar  
 Ciril Medved as Sitna kmetica  
 Janez Cesar as Pravdarski kmet  
 Metka Bucar as Postarna gospodicna  
 Masa Slavec as Postarana gospodicna  
 Drago Zupan as Pl. Orel  
 Ivan Mrak as Pianist  
 Luce Florentini as Pepe - Zozef  
 Lojze Drenovec as Penzionist  
 Stane Sever as Pavle  
 Stane Potokar as Mozakar  
 Marija Nablocka as Madam Lili  
 Mila Kacic as Kuharica 
 Josip Danes as Komodni Dunajcan  
 France Kosmac as Komi z zobotrebcem  
 Tina Leon as Julija  
 Ante Gnidovec as Gostilnicar  
 Nezka Gorjup as Gospa z deznikom  
 Lili Novy as Dunajcanka 
 Dusa Pockaj as Blondinka  
 Helmut Turzansky as Baron Herbert  
 Zvone Sintic as Avskultant  
 Bojan Stupica as dr. Andrej Vrbanoj  
 Mira Stupica as Ancka

References

Bibliography 
 Steve Fallon. Slovenia. Lonely Planet, 2010.

External links 
 

1953 films
1950s historical drama films
Yugoslav historical drama films
Slovene-language films
Films set in Trieste
Films set in the 1890s
1953 drama films
Yugoslav black-and-white films